Indrajit Lamba (born 7 October 1949) is an Indian equestrian. He competed in the individual eventing at the 1996 Summer Olympics. He also won a Bronze in the individual eventing in the 2002 Asian Games.

References

External links
 

1949 births
Living people
Indian male equestrians
Olympic equestrians of India
Equestrians at the 1996 Summer Olympics
Place of birth missing (living people)
Asian Games medalists in equestrian
Equestrians at the 2002 Asian Games
Asian Games bronze medalists for India
Medalists at the 2002 Asian Games